Mesotes rutilus, Prado's coastal house snake, is a species of snake in the family Colubridae.  The species is native to Brazil.

References

Mesotes
Snakes of South America
Endemic fauna of Brazil
Reptiles of Brazil
Reptiles described in 1942